Basic Education High School No. 1 Latha (formerly Central High School; commonly known as Latha 1 High School) is a public high school in Latha township, Yangon. The school's main building is a landmark protected by the city, and is listed on the Yangon City Heritage List.

Alumni 
 Min Aung Hlaing: Commander-in-chief of Myanmar Armed Forces
 Nicky: Singer

References

High schools in Yangon